The Murphy Range is a small subrange of the Kitimat Ranges, located on the westernmost side of Princess Royal Island, British Columbia, Canada.

References

Murphy Range in the Canadian Mountain Encyclopedia

Kitimat Ranges